Richard Eugene Cross (1910-1996) was an American business executive in the automotive industry, a lawyer, and civic leader.

Civic leadership
Cross participated in many civic activities and provided leadership in several organizations that included citizens groups on housing, schools, and police-community relations. He marched with Martin Luther King Jr. after the 1967 Detroit riot. He headed the Detroit Commission on Community Relations as the mayor's appointee from 1958 to 1962.

He was one of the first commissioners of the Michigan Department of Civil Rights, but in 1965, Cross declined a reappointment request by Governor George W. Romney because of the pressing business conditions at American Motors Corporation (AMC). For twenty years, Cross was head of the executive committee for the United Negro College Fund in Michigan. While lobbying International Olympic Committee president Avery Brundage in 1963 for Detroit to be selected for the 1968 Summer Olympics, Cross highlighted what he said were racial difficulties in other major, U.S. cities before asserting "we really have a fine, stable community here that is adjusting to the race problems in a very mature way."

Cross was a founder and chairman of the Hundred Club of Detroit, whose purpose is to help provide for the widows and dependents of policemen and firemen who lose their lives in the line of duty.
 
Cross was elected in 1959 as the only United States representative to the Pan American Games Committee, on which he served until 1963. In 1960, he also served as member at large on the United States Olympic Committee.

Career at AMC 
Cross was a "quiet, analytical attorney" who served as legal counsel for American Motors Corporation (AMC). He drew up the 1954 merger papers that created the new company from Nash-Kelvinator and Hudson Motor Car Company. Cross became a director of the company in 1954, and in 1959, a member of the policy committee.

He was one of a duumvirate succeeding George W. Romney, who at the time was technically on leave of absence to run for governor of Michigan. In 1962, at age 52, Cross was elected chairman of the board of directors as well as the chief executive officer (CEO), while Roy Abernethy was named president and chief operating officer (COO). Annual salary for Cross was $90,000, while Abernathy was granted $125,000.

This was a turbulent time in AMC's strategy development. While the rest of the industry had record earnings, AMC's profits and return on sales dropped (from 7% of its sales in 1959, to an estimated 3.5% return for 1962). However, in September 1962, AMC paid off a US$80 million loan and became the only U.S. automaker free of long-term debt. Management could go after new markets, but the company had developed a resistance to extensive restyling.

Cross supported the change away from Romney's legacy of the "economy-car" image and their "boxy" styling. This involved the automaker making major design, styling, and marketing changes, as well as the addition of new convertibles and sporty models that were promoted by Abernethy.

However, AMC's total national automobile market share declined from just over 5% to a "meager 3.71 percent ... the future of the smallest American car manufactures looked bleak." As 1966 began, four top managers began working to steer the automaker from disaster. By spring, the automotive press and stockholders were concerned about the future of the firm and held Cross as Chairman of the Board "on the firing line" and also felt that others in AMC's management team "were out of touch with the car market." Cross launched an aggressive plan to find a merger partner or a buyout to continue operations. The automaker even contacted the U.S. Department of Justice about possible antitrust law implications with possible deals with firms that included Chrysler, Kaiser-Jeep, International Harvester, White Motor, BorgWarner, General Electric, as well as Sears, Roebuck. However, during January 1966 Robert B. Evans purchased 220,000 shares of AMC making him the largest single shareholder. By March 1966, Evans gained a seat on the board of directors. Evans was known for fixing companies in trouble and leading them into the future. 

Evans publicly supported the leadership of Cross and Abernethy. In June 1966, Cross was forced to step down from the CEO post and was replaced by Evans. Cross became chairman of AMC's executive committee and could devote more time to his practice of law in Detroit, Michigan.

He died in his home in Rochester Hills, Michigan, on 31 August 1996.

References 

People in the automobile industry
American chief executives of manufacturing companies
American chief executives in the automobile industry
American Motors people
1910 births
1996 deaths
University of Michigan Law School alumni
20th-century American businesspeople